Amos Bairoch (born 22 November 1957) is a Swiss bioinformatician and Professor of Bioinformatics at the Department of Human Protein Sciences of the University of Geneva where he leads the CALIPHO group at the Swiss Institute of Bioinformatics (SIB) combining bioinformatics, curation, and experimental efforts to functionally characterize human proteins.

His father was the economic historian Paul Bairoch.

Education
His first project as a Ph.D. student was the development of PC/Gene, an MS-DOS–based software package for the analysis of protein and nucleotide sequences. PC/Gene was commercialized, first by a Swiss company (Genofit) then by Intelligenetics in the US which was later bought by Oxford Molecular.

Research
His main work is in the field of protein sequence analysis and more particularly in the development of databases and software tools for this purpose. His most important contribution is the input of human knowledge by careful manual annotation in protein-related data.

While working on PC/Gene he started to develop an annotated protein sequence database which became Swiss-Prot and was first released in July 1986. From 1988 onward it has been a collaborative project with the Data Library group of the European Molecular Biology Laboratory which later evolved into the European Bioinformatics Institute (EBI).

The Swiss-Prot database is the primary protein sequence resource in the world and has been a key research instrument for both bioinformaticians and laboratory-based scientists in a very wide range of applications. A measure of its success is the recent development of UniProt, the world's most comprehensive catalogue of information on proteins. UniProt is a central information resource of protein sequences and functions created by joining the information contained in Swiss-Prot, TrEMBL, and the American Protein Information Resource (PIR) databases.

In 1988, he started to develop PROSITE, a database of protein families and domains. A little while later he created ENZYME, a nomenclature database on enzymes as well as SeqAnalRef, a sequence analysis bibliographic reference database.

In collaboration with Ron Appel he initiated, in August 1993, the first molecular biology WWW server, ExPASy. What was intended as a prototype grew rapidly into a major site that provides access to the many databases produced partially or completely in Geneva as well as many tools for the analysis of proteins (proteomics).

In 1998, with colleagues in Geneva and Lausanne, he was one of the founders of the SIB Swiss Institute of Bioinformatics, whose mission is to establish in Switzerland a center of excellence in the field of bioinformatics with an emphasis on research, education, services and the developments of databases and tools.

In November 1997, together with Ron Appel and Denis Hochstrasser, he founded GeneBio (Geneva Bioinformatics SA), a company involved in biological knowledge. In April 2000, the above persons with Keith Rose and Robin Offord founded GeneProt (Geneva Proteomics), a high throughput proteomics company that ceased operations in 2005.

Since 2009, in the framework of the CALIPHO group, directed by himself and Lydie Lane, he is involved in the development of neXtProt a resource which aims to provide life scientists with a broad spectrum of knowledge on all human proteins.

He is also involved in the development of the Cellosaurus a knowledge resource on cell lines.

According to Google Scholar and Scopus,  his most highly cited peer reviewed papers in scientific journals have been published in Nucleic Acids Research, the Biochemical Journal, Nature, Briefings in Bioinformatics, and Database.

Awards and honours
Bairoch was the recipient of the 1993 Friedrich Miescher Award from the Swiss Society of Biochemistry, the 1995 Helmut Horten Foundation Incentive Award, the 2004 Pehr Edman award, the 2004 European Latsis Prize, the 2010 Otto Naegeli
prize, the 2011 HUPO Distinguished Achievement Award in Proteomic Sciences., the 2013 EUPA proteomics pioneer award, and in 2018 the ABRF Award.

Quotes

References

1957 births
Living people
Swiss bioinformaticians
Fellows of the International Society for Computational Biology